The 2017–18 FC Girondins de Bordeaux season was the 137th professional season of the club since its creation in 1881. Bordeaux finished their domestic season in 6th place, qualifying for the UEFA Europa League next season.

Players

As of 31 August 2017.

On loan

Transfers

In

Loans in

Out

Loans out

Competitions

Overall

Ligue 1

League table

Results summary

Results by round

Matches

Coupe de France

Coupe de la Ligue

UEFA Europa League

Third qualifying round

Goalscorers

References

FC Girondins de Bordeaux seasons
Bordeaux
Girondins de Bordeaux